Capitol is a populated place in Carter County, Montana, United States.

Geography

Capitol was named after Capitol Rock, a prominent landmark in the nearby Long Pine Hills. Capitol is located on the Little Missouri River and close to the South Dakota border.

Post Office
Capitol had a post office from 1891–1982. Residents who have a Capitol address receive their mail from the neighboring post office of Camp Crook, South Dakota.

Church
A church named 'Little Missouri Lutheran Church' is located near Capitol. The congregation celebrated its 125th anniversary in 2014. The church was established 5 months before Montana became a state.

Cemeteries
Capitol Cemetery is located northeast of town on Little Missouri Road. The Little Missouri Lutheran Church Cemetery is located behind the current church location.

Population
As of 2017 the population of Capitol was 3.

References

Former populated places in Carter County, Montana